Gutterdämmerung  is a 2016 rock music film directed by Björn Tagemose, promoted as being “the loudest silent movie ever". The film features a score provided by a live rock band. The film stars Iggy Pop, Grace Jones, Henry Rollins, Lemmy, Nina Hagen, Tom Araya, Slash, Jesse Hughes, and Josh Homme and Justice. The film is shot in black and white in the tradition of classic silent film of 1920's Hollywood, however, instead of having backing piano music, a live rock group hammers out the accompanying soundtrack, whilst special effects from the film explode to life all around the audience. The film's plot has a religious setting and is focused around "The Devil's Evil Guitar" which has been removed from the world by the supreme being, in a newly puritanical world where rock and roll is relegated to history. Grace Jones plays "the devil", governing the testosterone of the evil rock'n'roll masses. Henry Rollins stars as the puritanical Priest Svengali, A punk rock angel named Vicious (Iggy Pop) is sent to Earth to test humanity and to set the world on fire.

Cast

Iggy Pop as Vicious
Grace Jones as Death / The Devil
Henry Rollins as Priest Svengali
Lemmy as General
Nina Hagen
Tom Araya as the burning man
Slash as The Thief
Olivia Vinall as Juliette
Jesse Hughes Bounty Hunter
Ben Foster as Ben Foster
Josh Homme (as Joshua Homme)  
Mark Lanegan as Gravedigger
Thomas Law as Pete the Mod 
Laurie Kynaston as The Kid  
Hilde Van Mieghem as Soeur Geraldine 
Enoch Frost as Voodoo Leader
Kirstie Oswald as Soeur Gentile
Tuesday Cross as Billy (Tight bassist)
Volbeat (band)
Justice (band)
Ozark Henry

References

External links
 
 
 Official Trailor
 Artist interviews

2016 films
American silent films
American rock music films
American musical films
The Devil in film
2010s English-language films
2010s American films